Six ships of the Royal Navy have borne the name HMS Albatross, after the seabird, the albatross. A seventh was planned but never completed:

  was a 16-gun brig-sloop launched in 1795 and sold in 1807.
  was a survey schooner purchased in 1826 and sold in 1833.
  was a 16-gun brig launched in 1842 and broken up in 1860.
 HMS Albatross was to have been a wood screw sloop. She was ordered in 1862 but was cancelled in 1863.
  was a  composite screw sloop launched in 1873 and broken up in 1889.
  was a torpedo boat destroyer launched in 1898, reclassified as a  destroyer in 1913 and sold in 1920.
  was a seaplane tender launched in 1928 for the Royal Australian Navy. She was transferred to the Royal Navy in 1938, and converted to a repair ship in 1942.  She was sold into mercantile service in 1946 and was sold for scrapping in 1954.

See also

Royal Navy ship names